Teleiopsis albifemorella is a moth of the family Gelechiidae. It is found in the southern and northern parts of the Alps. It is also found in the Spanish Pyrenees and the mountains of the Abruzzo region in Italy and in former Serbia and Montenegro.

The wingspan is 19–23 mm. Adults are on wing in July to September.

The larvae feed on Rumex scutatus.

External links
Fauna Europaea

Teleiopsis
Moths of Europe
Moths described in 1867